Ichthyodes szekessyi is a beetle species from the family Cerambycidae. The scientific name of this species was first published in 1953 by Breuning.

References

Ichthyodes
Beetles described in 1953